C. glauca  may refer to:
 Canna glauca, a plant species native to the wetlands of tropical America
 Casuarina glauca, the swamp she-oak, a plant species native to the east coast of Australia
 Citrus glauca, the desert lime, a thorny shrub species endemic to semi-arid regions of Australia
 Coronilla glauca, the sea-green or day-smelling coronilla, a small evergreen shrub species native to the Mediterranean region
 Cyathea glauca, a tree fern species endemic to Réunion

Synonyms
 Carex glauca, a synonym for Carex flacca, an ornamental sedge species native to Europe and North Africa

See also
 Glauca (disambiguation)